Ramil Ganiyev (Рамиль Ганиев; born 23 September 1968 in Yangiabad, Tashkent Region) is a retired Uzbekistani decathlete of Tatar parents.

Achievements

External links

sports-reference

1968 births
Living people
Uzbekistani decathletes
Athletes (track and field) at the 1992 Summer Olympics
Athletes (track and field) at the 1996 Summer Olympics
Olympic athletes of the Unified Team
Olympic athletes of Uzbekistan
Athletes (track and field) at the 1994 Asian Games
Athletes (track and field) at the 1998 Asian Games
Asian Games medalists in athletics (track and field)
People from Tashkent Region
Asian Games gold medalists for Uzbekistan
Asian Games silver medalists for Uzbekistan
Medalists at the 1994 Asian Games
Medalists at the 1998 Asian Games